BBC Radio One Live in Concert is a live album released in 1993 by British rock band New Model Army. It was taken from the Live In Concert show broadcast on BBC Radio 1, and was recorded live at the Berlin Eissporthalle on 5 November 1990.

Track listing
"Ambition"
"The Charge"
"Purity"
"Innocence"
"Love Songs"
"Lurhstaap"
"Green and Grey"
"Stupid Questions"
"Smalltown England"
"Archway Towers"
"51st State"
"I Love the World"
"White Coats"

Personnel
Justin Sullivan – vocals, guitar
Robert Heaton – drums
Nelson – bass
Adrian Portas – keyboards
Ed Alleyne-Johnson – violin

References

BBC Radio recordings
New Model Army (band) live albums
1993 live albums